Dinah Jane 1 is the debut extended play (EP) by American singer Dinah Jane. The EP was released on April 19, 2019 through Hitco, accompanied by its lead single "Heard It All Before". Dinah Jane 1 follows the September 2018 release of Jane's debut solo single "Bottled Up", featuring Ty Dolla Sign and Marc E. Bassy.

Background and release 
Jane said she initially did not want to release the EP, however was convinced otherwise by record executive L.A. Reid. On March 28, 2019, Jane released the cover art for Dinah Jane 1 via social media, writing alongside it "4/19", referring to the date of the extended play's release. In the week prior to the EP's release, Jane began teasing the songs via social media by releasing snippets of audio for fans to listen to. Jane released audio versions of each track to YouTube, each of which doubled as lyric videos. A music video for lead single "Heard It All Before" was also released.

Critical reception 
Nylon named it one of the best musical releases of the week, remarking that Jane has "finally found her sound". Billboard called the songs "wildly catchy" and "old-school R&B with 2019 club-ready treatment". Mike Neid of Idolator called the EP a "fitting introduction to the pop star's inner thoughts".

Track listing

References

2019 debut EPs
Albums produced by J. R. Rotem